Charanjit Singh (born 3 September 1978) is an Indian former cricketer. He played seven first-class matches for Bengal between 1997 and 2000.

See also
 List of Bengal cricketers

References

External links
 

1978 births
Living people
Indian cricketers
Bengal cricketers
People from Howrah